Isochilus linearis, the narrowleaf equallip orchid, is a species of orchid native to Mexico, the West Indies, Central America and South America.

References

linearis
Orchids of North America
Orchids of Central America
Orchids of South America